André Charles Jean Popp (19 February 1924 – 10 May 2014) was a French composer, arranger and screenwriter.

Biography

Popp was born into a family of German-Dutch background, in Fontenay-le-Comte, Vendée. He started his career as a church organist, filling the place of the abbot who had been called up to serve in World War II in 1939. Popp studied music at the Saint Joseph Institute. In the 1950s he worked for the French radio station RTF, composing music for the Club d'Essai and, from 1953 to 1960, La Bride sur le cou. He orchestrated a number of Juliette Gréco albums in the late 1950s and early 1960s. In the 1960s, he co-wrote, with Pierre Cour, three songs for the Eurovision Song Contest: "Tom Pillibi", which won the competition for France when it was sung by 18-year-old newcomer Jacqueline Boyer in 1960, "Le chant de Mallory", the 1964 French entry, performed by another newcomer, Rachel, and "L'amour est bleu" (Love is Blue) which came fourth for Luxembourg in 1967, but which later became a number-one hit instrumental in the US for Paul Mauriat.

In 1957, Popp released Delirium in Hi-Fi (originally titled Elsa Popping et sa musique sidérante), a collaboration with Pierre Fatosme, an experiment in the recording techniques of the time.

Popp is the author of the pop song "" sung by Marie Laforêt. Its melody gained fame in the former Soviet Union as the background music to the Vremya television news programme's weather forecast since the early 1970s.

Popp made one-of-a-kind space-age instrumental recordings during the 1950s and by the early 1960s had built quite a good reputation in the music recording industry and was in demand as an arranger. He made orchestrations for Rive Gauche legend Juliette Gréco that were jazzy, urbane, vibrant, quirky, even cartoonish at times. The arrival of rock and roll in France and, consequentially, yé-yé music, dramatically changed the expectations of French audiences and record buyers, especially the younger ones, who were more interested in singers like Johnny Hallyday than Jacques Brel, although chansonniers such as Brel ultimately remained just as popular as they had been in the 1950s.

Popp had to adapt to these new trends. He worked almost exclusively with female singers during this period, preferably the Lolita types, such as Chantal Goya, but also with Françoise Hardy. "Love is Blue", a song Vicky Leandros performed at the Eurovision Song Contest 1967 on behalf of Luxembourg, also recorded by Claudine Longet, became internationally popular. In these recordings, Popp does not sacrifice the sophistication of his 1950s orchestrations, but rather than animate the songs, he seems to set the tone, the mood, painting a colorful picture. Sometimes there are silky, smooth strings; often there is harpsichord and oboe and flute; elsewhere adventurous brassy fanfares; occasionally an ethereal soprano chorus; always some magical musical final touch, like the faint, quavering harmonica in "Manchester et Liverpool". Marie Laforêt's voice fit perfectly in André Popp's 1960s soundscapes and he created more of them for her than for her contemporaries.

Popp died at his apartment in the Paris suburb of Puteaux on 10 May 2014, the very day that his last interview, with Benoît Duteurtre, was broadcast on France Musique.

Discography
André Popp présente Elsa Popping et sa musique sidérante. Fredo Minablos, Marie-Jeanne Popp, vocals; André Popp and his orchestra; Pierre Fatosme, sound effects. LP recording, 1 disc: analog, 33⅓ rpm, monaural, 12 in. Fontana 680201. N.p.: Fontana, 1957. Reissued on CD, Basta 30-90312. [Aalsmeer, the Netherlands]: Basta, 1996; Japanese reissue, CD recording, MSI MSIG-0032 Tokyo: MSI, 2003.
Delirium in Hi-Fi. Adventures in Sound. LP recording, 1 disc: analog, 33⅓ rpm, monaural, 12 in. Columbia WL 106. New York: Columbia Records, 1955.
The Adventures of Piccolo, Saxie and Company/Passport for Piccolo, Saxie and Company. Narrated by Victor Borge; orchestra conducted by the André Popp. Columbia Masterlength Stories. LP recording, 1 disc: analog, 33⅓ rpm, monaural, 12 in. Columbia CL 1233. New York: Columbia Records, 1959.
Popped!
Andre Popp et son orchestre
Why Say Goodbye
La musique qui fait Popp. Het Metropole Orkest; Jan Stulen, conductor. LP recording, 1 disc: analog, 33⅓ rpm, monaural, 12 in. Fontana 660008TR. [Paris]: Fontana, 1958. Reissued on CD, Basta 30-9057-2. [Aalsmeer, the Netherlands]: Basta, 1993.
Die neuen Abenteuer von Piccolo, Sax & Co.
Popp Musique
La Symphonique Ecologique

References

External links
 Space Age Pop website bio
 Artist Direct website quoting the All Music Guide bio (Jason Ankeny)
 Discogs bio
 

1924 births
2014 deaths
People from Fontenay-le-Comte
French composers
French male composers
French music arrangers
French male screenwriters
French screenwriters
Eurovision Song Contest winners
Columbia Records artists
20th-century French musicians
20th-century French male musicians